This glossary of quantum computing is a list of definitions of terms and concepts used in quantum computing, its sub-disciplines, and related fields.

Notes

References

Further reading

Textbooks

Academic papers

 Table 1 lists switching and dephasing times for various systems.

Models of computation
Quantum cryptography
Information theory
Computational complexity theory
Classes of computers
Theoretical computer science
Open problems
Computer-related introductions in 1980
Emerging technologies
Quantum computing
Wikipedia glossaries using description lists